The 24th Saturn Awards, honoring the best in science fiction, fantasy and horror film and television in 1997, were held on June 10, 1998.

Below is a complete list of nominees and winners. Winners are highlighted in bold.

Winners and nominees

Film

Television

Programs

Acting

Special awards
George Pal Memorial Award
 Dean Devlin

Life Career Award
 Michael Crichton
 James Karen

President's Award
 James Cameron

Service Award
 Bradley Marcus and Kevin Marcus

Special Award
 Gods and Monsters

References

External links
 Official website

Saturn Awards ceremonies
1998 awards
1998 film awards
1998 television awards